Robert Clinton Hogue (April 5, 1921 – December 22, 1987) was an American professional baseball player, a right-handed relief pitcher who appeared in 172 Major League games over five seasons (–52) for the Boston Braves, St. Louis Browns and New York Yankees. He was a United States Navy veteran of World War II.

In his rookie MLB season with the 1948 Braves, Hogue appeared in 40 games and compiled an 8–2 record, an earned run average of 3.23 and two saves to help Boston win its last National League pennant. In his only starting assignment, on July 8 against the Brooklyn Dodgers, he pitched ineffectively and lasted only two innings, but the Braves came back to win the contest, 7–4. He did not appear in the 1948 World Series. During his tenure with the Braves, Hogue learned to throw the knuckleball, which became an effective pitch in his repertoire.

Three seasons later, Hogue bounced from the Braves to the second division St. Louis Browns of the American League to the powerhouse Yankees' Triple-A Kansas City Blues into mid-August. But on August 20, 1951, the Yankees recalled Hogue and another player from the Blues for the stretch run, and each contributed to New York's third straight AL pennant. (The other player was a 19-year-old rookie centerfielder named Mickey Mantle.) During the rest of the American League season, Hogue appeared in seven games in relief for the Yanks, allowing four hits and no runs in 7 innings pitched and winning his only decision. In the 1951 World Series, Hogue appeared in two games (both Yankee losses) in relief, but only allowed one hit, a single to former teammate Eddie Stanky in Game 3, and did not allow any inherited baserunners to score. Those two games were the only games lost by the Yankees in a six-game triumph over their NL neighbors, the New York Giants.

His MLB career ended in 1952, as the Yankees put him on waivers and he was claimed by the Browns, who used him in eight games during August and September.

References

External links

1921 births
1987 deaths
Baseball players from Miami
Boston Braves players
Dallas Rebels players
Hollywood Chiefs players
Kansas City Blues (baseball) players
Major League Baseball pitchers
Miami Wahoos players
Minneapolis Millers (baseball) players
New York Yankees players
St. Louis Browns players
Toronto Maple Leafs (International League) players
Williston Oilers players
United States Navy personnel of World War II